Great Minds with Dan Harmon is an American comedy television series that aired from February 25 to June 16, 2016 on History. The series stars writer Dan Harmon and his assistant Spencer Crittenden, who transport a series of historical figures to the present. The series is part of History's "Night Class" programming block and was available to stream on History's website and YouTube channel. The videos have since been removed but short clips are still available on YouTube.

Premise
Writer Dan Harmon has his assistant Spencer Crittenden construct a time machine to transport historical figures from the past so he can interview them for the History channel. The interviewees only survive for a few hours before undergoing a "total protoplasmic disconversion" and collapsing into dust, which Spencer collects in a jar.

Cast and characters

Main

 Dan Harmon as himself
 Spencer Crittenden as himself

Guest

 Jack Black as Ludwig van Beethoven
 Scott Adsit as Ernest Hemingway
 Jason Sudeikis as Thomas Edison
 Aubrey Plaza as Mary Wollstonecraft
 Thomas Middleditch as William Shakespeare
 Ron Funches as Idi Amin
 Sarah Silverman as Betsy Ross
 Kristen Schaal as Amelia Earhart
 Nick Kroll as Sigmund Freud
 Paul F. Tompkins as Edgar Allan Poe
 Danny Pudi as Buddha
 Andy Dick as John Wilkes Booth
 Gillian Jacobs as Ada Lovelace
 Dana Carvey as John F. Kennedy
 Matt Walsh as Harry S. Truman

Episodes

Production

Development
On August 5, 2015, it was announced that IFC had given the production a pilot order. The project at that stage of development was described as a comedic panel show where trending topics would be discussed. The show's twist would be that the panel would be made up of a revolving cast of comedians in character as various historical figures. The pilot was created by Richard Korson who executive produced alongside Dan Harmon, Jay Peterson, and Kara Welker. Production companies involved with the episode included Matador Content.

On February 18, 2016, it was announced that the project had been redeveloped into a short-form series set to air during a new late-night comedy programming block on History titled Night Class. The panel show format was dropped in favor a more traditional narrative structure.

Casting
In addition to featuring Harmon as host, the IFC pilot contained a panel including Rory Albanese as Benjamin Franklin, Robert Smigel as Albert Einstein, Bonnie McFarlane as Eleanor Roosevelt, and Seaton Smith as Frederick Douglass.

Alongside the announcement of the series' move to History, it was confirmed that guest actors would include Jack Black, Sarah Silverman, Jason Sudeikis, Dana Carvey, Aubrey Plaza, Kristen Schaal, Nick Kroll, Scott Adsit, Andy Dick, Ron Funches, Paul F. Tompkins, and Thomas Middleditch.

References

External links
 

2010s American comedy television series
2016 American television series debuts
2016 American television series endings
Television series by Matador Content